Segers is a Dutch patronymic surname. The mostly archaic Dutch given names Seger, Segher, Sieger and Zegher derive from Germanic Sigi- and -her, meaning "victorious lord". People with the surname Segers include

Carlos Segers (1900–1967), Argentine astronomer
Geno Segers (born 1978), American actor
Gert-Jan Segers (born 1969), Dutch political scientist and politician
Gunter Segers (born 1968), Belgian children's book author and illustrator
Gustaaf Segers (1848–1930), Belgian writer and scholar
Hans Segers (born 1961), Dutch goalkeeper
Hercules Segers (1589–1638), Dutch painter and printmaker
 (born 1929), Belgian composer, conductor and reed player
Noël Segers (born 1959), Belgian racing cyclist
 (1870–1946), Belgian government minister
 (1900–1983), Belgian government minister
Willy Segers (born 1958), Belgian politician

See also
Mount Segers, Antarctic mountain named after Chester W. Segers
Related surnames:
Seger
Segert
Seghers
Zegers

References

Dutch-language surnames
Patronymic surnames